Ludewa District is one of six districts in the Njombe Region in Tanzania, East Africa. Prior to 2012, the district was one of the seven districts of Iringa Region. The town of Ludewa is the administrative seat of the district. A hospital is located in the city. The district is bordered to the north by the Njombe Rural District and Makete District, to the southeast by the Ruvuma Region and to the southwest by the country of Malawi across Lake Nyasa.

In 2016 the Tanzania National Bureau of Statistics report there were 137,520 people in the district, from 133,218 in 2012.

Geography 
The district has a wide shore of Lake Nyasa with beaches in Lupingu and Manda and the mouth of Ruhuhu River.

Economy 

The primary occupations are livestock raising, subsistence farming, and fishing which encompasses 78% of peoples livelyhoods.

Mining 

The Liganga iron ore mine in Ludewa is a $1.8 billion USD project to mine iron ore and manufacture steel sheets. The complex is to produce one mt/y of steel, iron, titanium dioxide, and vanadium pentoxide.

There is a small amount of artisanal mining of gold and gem quality green tourmaline.

Administrative subdivisions 
Ludewa District is administratively divided into five divisions, twenty-six wards, with 77 villages, and 337 vitongoji.

Constituencies 
For parliamentary elections, Tanzania is divided into constituencies. As of the 2010 elections Ludewa District had one constituency:
 Ludewa Constituency

Wards 
Below are the 26 wards as follows:

 Ibumi
 Iwela
 Kilondo
 Lifuma
 Luana
 Ludende
 Ludewa
 Lugarawa
 Luilo
 Lumbila
 Lupanga
 Lupingu
 Madilu
 Madope
 Makonde
 Manda
 Masasi
 Mavanga
 Mawengi
 Milo
 Mkongobaki
 Mlangali
 Mundindi
 Nkomang'ombe
 Ruhuhu
Lubonde

Gallery

References 

Districts of Njombe Region